In molecular biology, the psi18S-841 is a member of the H/ACA class of snoRNA. This family is responsible for guiding the modification of uridine 841 in Drosophila 18S rRNA to pseudouridine.

References

External links 
 

Small nuclear RNA